SIS (Singapore Intercultural School) Group of Schools in Indonesia, is an intercultural school group founded in Jakarta, Indonesia. The SIS Group of Schools cater to students from preschool to junior college based on an international curriculum. The flagship school, SIS South Jakarta, is located next to Bona Vista Apartments in South Jakarta and has six sister schools in Indonesia, with additional schools in India, Korea and Myanmar.

History
In 1995, members of the Jakarta business community felt the need for a Singapore-style school in Jakarta to cater to expatriate children working in Indonesia. Several initial meetings with Singapore's Ambassador to Indonesia H.E. Edward Lee generated the enthusiasm needed to start the project. This culminated in a meeting in early 1996 with H.E. Deputy Prime Minister of Singapore, Dr. Tony Tan who was also then the Education Minister. The inspiration drawn from that meeting set the wheels in motion for the first SIS pilot school campus.

The team moved quickly to secure the help of Raffles Institution, Singapore's premier school. The expertise of one of Singapore's most respected educational leaders, Mr. Eugene Wijeyhsingha (former principal of Raffles Institution) was utilized to give the school a good foundation. And soon afterwards the Board of Governors of SIS successfully lobbied the release of Mr. Magendiran, also from Raffles Institution, to be the first Principal of the SIS pilot school campus in 1997.

This first pilot school welcomed its first batch of 25 pupils in January 1997. The school was set up with the moral support of Singapore's Ministry of Education and financial support from the International Finance Corporation. With the rising enrolment and also to cater to the international community, the school was moved to a larger premises in January 1999 at Gandaria in South Jakarta. Finally in January 2002, the group's flagship school, SIS South Jakarta (formerly SIS Bona Vista) opened the doors to its new building in the safe Bona Vista complex in Lebak Bulus, South Jakarta site with enrolment reaching 400 students from many nationalities. The founders later started secondary (secondary 1–4) and Pre-University Classes.

To comply with the new Ministry of Education regulation (Permendikbud Nomor 31 Tahun 2014), which also affected all International Schools in Indonesia – all SIS Group of Schools in Indonesia changed from "Singapore International School" to "Singapore Intercultural School".

Board of governors 
SIS Group of Schools board director is led by Alvin Hew, who is based in Singapore and is Group Managing Director of Southgate Ventures Pte Ltd. Alvin has played a major role in advising the trajectory of the school and drive the growth of SIS in Indonesia and other regions. He plays a key role to modernise how the school runs and markets itself by pivoting to a digital approach in marketing as well as in teaching and learning all the while constantly improving Program People & Place. This has led to a strong growth in earnings over the past few years.

SIS Group of Schools are also governed by other non-profit foundations.

Schools

SIS South Jakarta, Jakarta

Academics 
The primary curriculum emulates that of the curriculum used in Singapore schools. SIS South Jakarta is a certified Cambridge Centre for International Examinations (CIE) offering an international curriculum in the IGCSE. In September 2013, SIS South Jakarta became officially authorised as an IB World School (International Baccalaureate). From 2014, SIS South Jakarta has offered the IB Diploma Programme (IB DP) or an IB Courses program.

Faculty and students 
SIS South Jakarta students come from both Indonesia and over 23 countries. The faculty take a holistic approach to education that ensures students become well-balanced individuals. This approach is supported by Project Based Learning, Inquiry Based Learning as well as promoting Perseverance, Analytical Thinking, Collaboration & Communication and Entrepreneurism (P.A.C.E.). The Head Teacher is Mr. Marcus Kotze.

Facilities 
Located in Lebak Bulus, near the elite Pondok lndah and Cilandak neighbourhoods, SIS South Jakarta is two minutes from both the Outer Ring Road and the Lebak Bulus MRT station making it accessible from many parts of Jakarta. The SIS South Jakarta complex is in the secure Bona Vista neighbourhood. The school has a well equipped library, grass football pitch, full-court basketball, badminton, outdoor swimming pool, hybrid indoor/outdoor cafeteria, world-class biology and chemistry labs, student lounge, religious studies centres, music hall and plenty of open green areas for informal gathering and learning.

SIS Kelapa Gading, Jakarta

Academics 
The primary curriculum emulates that of the curriculum used in Singapore schools. SIS Kelapa Gading is a certified Cambridge Centre for International Examinations (CIE) offering an international curriculum in the IGCSE. SIS Kelapa Gading is an authorised IB World School (International Baccalaureate). SIS Kelapa Gading offers the IB Diploma Programme (IB DP) or an IB Courses program.

Faculty and students 
SIS Kelapa Gading has a diverse group of teachers from all over the world. Students are 12.5% international students and 87.5% local students with 16 countries represented. The faculty are encouraged to take a holistic approach to education that ensures students become well-balanced individuals. This approach is supported by Project Based Learning, Inquiry Based Learning as well as promoting Perseverance, Analytical Thinking, Collaboration & Communication and Entrepreneurism (P.A.C.E.). The Head Teacher is Mr. Michael R. Singh.

SIS Medan, Medan

Academics 
The primary curriculum emulates that of the curriculum used in Singapore schools. SIS Medan is a certified Cambridge Centre for International Examinations (CIE) offering an international curriculum in the IGCSE. SIS Medan is an authorised IB World School (International Baccalaureate). SIS Medan offers the IB Diploma Programme (IB DP) or an IB Courses program.

Faculty and students 
SIS Medan has a diverse group of teachers from all over the world. Students are 5% international students and 95% local students. The faculty are encouraged to take a holistic approach to education that ensures students become well-balanced individuals. This approach is supported by Project Based Learning, Inquiry Based Learning as well as promoting Perseverance, Analytical Thinking, Collaboration & Communication and Entrepreneurism (P.A.C.E.). The Head Teacher is Mr. Karl Bresler.

References

External links
 Official website
 SIS PIK
 SIS Kelapa Gading

Singaporean international schools in Indonesia
International schools in Jakarta
Cambridge schools in Indonesia
International Baccalaureate schools in Indonesia
South Jakarta
Educational institutions established in 1997
1997 establishments in Indonesia